The 1994 Patriot League baseball tournament was held on May 8, 1994 to determine the champion of the Patriot League for baseball for the 1994 NCAA Division I baseball season. The event matched Army and Navy, respectively the winners of the North Division and the winners of the South Division at Max Bishop Stadium, home field of the Navy Midshipmen in a best of three series. Steve Mauro of Navy was named Tournament Most Valuable Player.

Results

Game One

Game Two

References

Tournament
Patriot League Baseball Tournament
Patriot League baseball tournament
Patriot League baseball tournament